Hollyfield may refer to:

Surname
Larry Hollyfield (b. 1951/1952), basketball player
Lazlo Hollyfield, fictional character in comedy film Real Genius

Other
Hollyfield School, English co-educational academy school

See also
Holyfield (disambiguation)